Bonne mère is a 2021 French drama film directed by Hafsia Herzi. In June 2021, the film was selected to compete in the Un Certain Regard section at the 2021 Cannes Film Festival. At Cannes, it won the Ensemble Prize in the Un Certain Regard section.

Cast
Halima Benhamed as Nora
Sabrina Benhamed as Sabah
Jawed Hannachi Herzi as Jawed
Mourad Tahar Boussatha as Ellyes
Malik Bouchenaf as Amir
Justine Grégory as Muriel

Reception

References

External links

2021 drama films
2020s French-language films
French drama films
2020s French films